Dhinamum Ennai Gavani is a 1997 Tamil language crime film directed by A. R. Ramesh. The film stars Ramki, Sanghavi and Prakash Raj. It was released on 14 April 1997. The film turned out to be a failure at box office.

Plot

Rolex (Prakash Raj) is an intelligent international smuggler on the run. Later, the fearless Assistant Commissioner, Jai Kumar (Ramki), arrests him and sends him to jail. Jai Kumar and Raji (Sanghavi), who are deeply in love, get married. Rolex wants to take revenge on Jai Kumar by his way. Thereafter, he escapes from jail and fakes his death. What transpires later forms the crux of the story.

Cast

Ramki as ACP Jai Kumar IPS
Sanghavi as Raji
Prakash Raj as Rolex
Vivek as Inspector Balram
Thyagu as Ganesan
Ragasudha as Geetha
K. R. Vatsala
Balu Anand
Mohan Raman
Jeeva as Julie
Rajasekhar as Raji's father
Peeli Sivam
Raviraj as Ramdoss
Amanullah Khan
Laxmi Rattan
Vijay Eswaran
Arunagiri
Pasupathy
Anuradha
Shakita
Baby Anushya as Aishu
 Sridhar as dancer

Soundtrack

The film score and the soundtrack were composed by Sirpy. The soundtrack, released in 1997, features four tracks with lyrics written by Kamakodiyan, Palani Bharathi, and Arivumathi.

References

1997 films
1990s Tamil-language films
1990s crime action films
Indian crime action films
Films scored by Sirpy
Films directed by A. R. Ramesh